FK Liepāja/Mogo is a Latvian football club, founded in 2014. The club is based at the Daugava Stadium in Liepāja. FK Liepāja plays in the Latvian Higher League. In their first season they finished 4th in the 2014 Latvian Higher League.

History
FK Liepāja/Mogo was founded in March 2014 as a phoenix club and an indirect legatee of FK Liepājas Metalurgs, which was dissolved following the 2013 Latvian Higher League season due to the bankruptcy of its owner company and the sole sponsor metallurgical plant A/S Liepājas Metalurgs. FK Liepāja incorporated all the players, including youth teams, as well as the participation place in the 2014 Latvian Higher League, which had been at the disposal of Liepājas Metalurgs prior to its bankruptcy. The club is mainly sponsored by the Liepāja City Council and led by the former Latvian international footballer Māris Verpakovskis. The first manager of the team was Viktors Dobrecovs.

In its debut season FK Liepāja finished the championship in the top four. Jānis Ikaunieks, FK Liepāja midfielder, was voted as the best player of the 2014 season.

On 15 November 2016, Tamaz Pertia was appointed as the new manager of FK Liepāja.

On 14 September 2018, Gordon Young was appointed as the new manager of FK Liepāja.

League

Europe
1R: First round, 2Q: Second qualifying round, 3Q: Third qualifying round, PO: Play-off round

Honours
 Virslīga champions (1)
 2015
 Latvian Football Cup (2)
 2017, 2020

Sponsors

Players

Current squad

Staff

Managers

References

External links
Official website 

 
Football clubs in Latvia
Sport in Liepāja
Association football clubs established in 2014
2014 establishments in Latvia
Phoenix clubs (association football)